Anna Stephanie née Mika (1751-1802) was an Austrian stage actor. 

She was engaged at the Burgtheater in 1771-1802, where she was foremost known for her roles as heroines in tragedies. Among her roles where Minna in „Minna von Barnhelm“, Marie in „Deutschen Hausvater“, and Orsina in Lessings „Emilie Galotti“. She was married to the actor Gottfried Stephanie.

References 

  Biographisches Lexikon des Kaiserthums Oesterreich

1751 births
1802 deaths
18th-century Austrian actresses
Austrian stage actresses